Road House is a British play by Walter C. Hackett.

It ran for 341 performances at the Whitehall Theatre between 6 October 1932 and 5 August 1933. The original cast included Gordon Harker, Ronald Shiner, Godfrey Tearle, Marion Lorne and Jeanne Stuart, who was later replaced in her role by Sunday Wilshin.

Film adaptation
In 1934 the play was adapted into a film of the same title by Gainsborough Pictures. Directed by Maurice Elvey it featured a different cast from the play, except Harker who appeared in a similar role to that he had played on stage.

References

Bibliography
 Goble, Alan. The Complete Index to Literary Sources in Film. Walter de Gruyter, 1999.
 Wearing, J.P. The London Stage 1930–1939: A Calendar of Productions, Performers, and Personnel.  Rowman & Littlefield, 2014.

1932 plays
British plays adapted into films
West End plays
Plays by Walter C. Hackett